Siv Tørudbakken (born 25 May 1968) is a Norwegian politician for the Labour Party.

Following the 2007 Norwegian local elections she became the new leader (fylkesrådsleder) of Hedmark county cabinet, making her the first woman to hold this office. Tørudbakken has since 1995 held a variety of full-time political offices in the Hedmark county council.

References

1968 births
Living people
Labour Party (Norway) politicians
Hedmark politicians
Norwegian women in politics